is a Japanese astronomer and a discoverer of minor planets. He works at the Dynic Astronomical Observatory and has discovered many planets while working there. The Minor Planet Center credits him with the discovery of 122 numbered minor planets during 1988–2000.

The main-belt asteroid 3957 Sugie, discovered by Karl Reinmuth in 1933, was named in his honor. Naming citation was published on 1 September 1993.

List of discovered minor planets

References 
 

Discoverers of asteroids

20th-century Japanese astronomers
Living people
Year of birth missing (living people)